is a private junior college in Uji, Kyoto, Japan, established in 1960.

External links
 Official website 

Japanese junior colleges
Educational institutions established in 1960
Private universities and colleges in Japan
Universities and colleges in Kyoto Prefecture
1960 establishments in Japan